Francis Parry F.R.G.S. was a British businessman in China and member of the Legislative Council of Hong Kong.

Parry was a member of the Birley & Co. He was elected as Trustees for the Year 1865–66, 1866–67, 1867–68 by the Seatholders of the St. John's Cathedral, Hong Kong. He was appointed member of the Legislative Council vice Hugh Bold Gibb's absence on leave in July 1867.

He married Jane, widow of Rev. James Gwynne, Rector of Cork, and daughter of the late Charles Osburn, Fareham, Hampshire.

References

British businesspeople
British expatriates in Hong Kong
Fellows of the Royal Geographical Society
Hong Kong businesspeople
Members of the Legislative Council of Hong Kong
Year of birth missing
Year of death missing